Alireza Naghizadeh (born March 3, 1993) is an Iranian footballer who plays for Iranian club Mes Rafsanjan as a midfielder.

Club career
He played his entire career at Gostaresh.

Sepahan

Last Update:27 August 2019

International career

U23
He was invited to Iran U-23 training camp by Nelo Vingada to preparation for Incheon 2014 and 2016 AFC U-22 Championship.

References

1993 births
Living people
Sportspeople from Tabriz
Iranian footballers
Gostaresh Foulad F.C. players
Siah Jamegan players
Association football midfielders
Mes Rafsanjan players
Sepahan S.C. footballers
Tractor S.C. players